Franklin Blyden (born 1946) is a hurdler who represents the United States Virgin Islands. He competed in the men's 110 metres hurdles at the 1968 Summer Olympics.

References

1946 births
Living people
Athletes (track and field) at the 1968 Summer Olympics
United States Virgin Islands male hurdlers
Olympic track and field athletes of the United States Virgin Islands
Place of birth missing (living people)